John Florian Kordek (1938 – February 16, 2021) was an American diplomat who served as the United States Ambassador Extraordinary and Plenipotentiary to Botswana (1988–1989).

Kordek has also been Associate Vice President for External Relations at DePaul University in Chicago. Kordek was also an alumnus of DePaul University (1964, geography major) as well as the Johns Hopkins School of Advanced Studies (M.A, 1967). He was also a veteran of the U.S. Air Force.  In 2000, Bill Clinton appointed him to the Holocaust Memorial Council.

References

1938 births
2021 deaths
Ambassadors of the United States to Botswana
DePaul University alumni
Paul H. Nitze School of Advanced International Studies alumni